La Luette is a mountain of the Pennine Alps, located between the valleys of Bagnes and Hérens in the canton of Valais. It lies just south of Le Pleureur.

References

External links
 La Luette on Hikr

Mountains of the Alps
Alpine three-thousanders
Mountains of Switzerland
Mountains of Valais